Rich Mountain is the second highest point of the U.S. Interior Highlands and Ouachita Mountains, and in the U.S. state of Arkansas; it is also the site of Queen Wilhelmina State Park. Rich Mountain is a long, generally east–west-trending ridge composed of hard sandstone. It is located just outside of Mena, Arkansas and is intersected by the Arkansas-Oklahoma border.

Arkansas State Highway 88 and Oklahoma State Highway 1, collectively known as the Talimena Scenic Drive, traverse the entire top of Rich Mountain and provide excellent vistas of the surrounding Ouachita Mountains.

References

Ouachita Mountains
Landforms of Le Flore County, Oklahoma
Landforms of Polk County, Arkansas
Mountains of Arkansas
Mountains of Oklahoma